Serreta may refer to:
Serreta (Azores), a parish in the Azores, Portugal
serreta, a type of noseband for horses